Mary Alice Cavendish, Duchess of Devonshire,  (29 July 1895 – 24 December 1988) was a British courtier who served as Mistress of the Robes to Queen Elizabeth II from 1953 to 1967. She was the granddaughter of Prime Minister Robert Gascoyne-Cecil, 3rd Marquess of Salisbury.

Early life
She was born the Honourable Mary Alice Gascoyne-Cecil in Hatfield, Hertfordshire on 29 July 1895.  She was the second daughter of James Gascoyne-Cecil, Viscount Cranborne, and Lady Cicely Alice Gore, who served as Extra Lady of the Bedchamber to Queen Alexandra. Her maternal grandparents were Arthur Gore, 5th Earl of Arran and Lady Edith Jocelyn (daughter of Robert Jocelyn, Viscount Jocelyn and sister of Robert Jocelyn, 4th Earl of Roden). Her paternal grandparents were Robert Gascoyne-Cecil, 3rd Marquess of Salisbury and the former Georgiana Alderson (eldest daughter of Sir Edward Hall Alderson, a Baron of the Exchequer).

In 1903, her father succeeded as the Marquess of Salisbury and she was styled Lady Mary Gascoyne-Cecil. Her older brother, Robert became the 5th Marquess of Salisbury upon their father's death in 1947. Her younger brother, Lord David Cecil, was a prominent biographer, historian and academic.

Functions
She was Mistress of the Robes to Elizabeth II from 1953 to 1967 and Chancellor of the University of Exeter from 1955 to 1972. She was awarded Hon. LLD (Exon) in 1956.

The Duchess of Devonshire had an interest in Jacob sheep and kept a flock at Chatsworth House in Derbyshire. When a breed society, the Jacob Sheep Society, was formed in July 1969, she became its first president. From 1972 onwards, the society published a flock book.

Marriage and children
On 21 April 1917, Lady Mary was married to Edward Cavendish, Marquess of Hartington. Edward was the eldest son of Victor Cavendish, 9th Duke of Devonshire and his wife, Evelyn Cavendish, Duchess of Devonshire (eldest daughter of Henry Petty-Fitzmaurice, 5th Marquess of Lansdowne). In 1938, he succeeded his father as the 10th Duke of Devonshire. They had five children:

 William John Robert Cavendish, Marquess of Hartington (10 December 1917 – 10 September 1944), killed in action in World War II.  Married to Kathleen Kennedy, daughter of Ambassador Joseph P. Kennedy and sister of John F. Kennedy (later U.S. president).
 Andrew Robert Buxton Cavendish, 11th Duke of Devonshire (2 January 1920 – 3 May 2004). Married Deborah Mitford
 Lady Mary Cavendish (1922–1922), who died in infancy.
 Lady Elizabeth Georgiana Alice Cavendish (1926–2018), who never married. She served as an Extra Lady-in-Waiting to Princess Margaret, Countess of Snowdon.
 Lady Anne Evelyn Beatrice Cavendish (1927–2010), a prison visitor who married Michael Lambert Tree.

On 26 November 1950, her husband Edward Cavendish, 10th Duke of Devonshire, had a heart attack and died at Compton Place while being attended by John Bodkin Adams, the suspected serial killer. In the process of transferring his assets to his son, the death of the Duke fell 10 weeks prior to a required 5-year period, and his estate was subjected to taxes of 80%.

Honours
She was appointed a Commander of the Order of the British Empire (CBE) in 1946 and a Dame Grand Cross of the Royal Victorian Order (GCVO) in 1955.

Death
The Duchess died in Westminster, London, aged 93, and is buried next to her husband in the churchyard at Edensor, Derbyshire, near Chatsworth.

References

External links

1895 births
1988 deaths
Mary Cavendish, Duchess of Devonshire
Mary Cavendish, Duchess of Devonshire
English duchesses by marriage
Daughters of British marquesses
Chancellors of the University of Exeter
Mistresses of the Robes to Elizabeth II
Dames Grand Cross of the Royal Victorian Order
Commanders of the Order of the British Empire
Grand Crosses 1st class of the Order of Merit of the Federal Republic of Germany
Wives of knights